Bedotia leucopteron is a species of rainbowfish from the subfamily Bedotiinae which occurs in the middle reaches of Rianila River basin in eastern Madagascar. This species was described in 2007 by Paul V. Loiselle and Damaris M. Rodríguez from types collected in the Sandrakatrana Stream at Ampasimbe Village in Toamasina Province.

References

leucopteron
Fish described in 2007
Taxa named by Paul V. Loiselle